The New England Culinary Institute (NECI) was a private for-profit culinary school in Montpelier, Vermont. It was open for 40 years before shutting down as result of the COVID-19 pandemic.

History 
NECI was founded on June 15, 1980 by Fran Voigt and John Dranow. The first NECI class, conducted by Chef Michel LeBorgne, had seven students. The enrollment rose to approximately 800 in 1999, but fell to 500 in 2015 and to around 300 at the beginning of 2017. A second campus was operated in Essex, Vermont, from August 1989 through August 2009.

The institute ran a number of restaurants in Montpelier, and also provided food service for Vermont College and National Life. It is accredited by the Accrediting Commission of Career Schools and Colleges.

By the 2010s, enrollment in culinary institutes in the United States was in decline, and culinary programs nationwide were closing. The institute discontinued all credit-bearing academic programs in the summer of 2021. The institution's official statement about the closing stated that "the pandemic proved to be the burden that we could not overcome.  As directed by the State of Vermont we closed all our retail operations in March 2020, which severely limited our ability to continue to deliver a college level, hands on culinary education, on an economically viable basis."

Notable alumni
 Amanda Chantal Bacon - American entrepreneur, cookbook author, and wellness influencer
 Alton Brown – Host of Good Eats, Feasting on Asphalt, and Iron Chef America
 Paul Hogan – Former Australian Consul turned celebrity butler
 Gavin Kaysen – Chef de cuisine of Cafe Boulud in New York City, one of Food & Wine's "Best New Chefs", and Next Iron Chef contestant

References

External links
 

Cooking schools in the United States
Buildings and structures in Montpelier, Vermont
Essex, Vermont
Private universities and colleges in Vermont
Educational institutions established in 1980
Education in Washington County, Vermont
1980 establishments in Vermont